Luis Vázquez may refer to:

 Luis Vázquez Martínez (born 1949), Spanish applied mathematician
 Luis Vázquez (footballer) (born 2001), Argentine footballer for Boca Juniors

See also
Luis Vasquez (disambiguation)